Ramesses Moore-McGuinness (born on January 6, 2000) is a U.S. Virgin Islands soccer player who currently plays for Pittsburgh City United FC of the UPSL, and the US Virgin Islands national team.

Born and raised Saint Croix, McGuiness moved with his brothers to West Windsor, New Jersey in 2015 and attended West Windsor-Plainsboro High School South, where he played prep soccer.

College career
McGuinness played one year of college soccer for the Cougars of Kean University. In total he made seventeen appearances for the team, scoring five goals.

Club career
In August 2021 it was announced that McGuiness signed for Pittsburgh City United FC of the United Premier Soccer League, the fourth tier of the United States soccer league system for the 2021 season. He was joined at the club by USVI national teammate Jett Blaschka.

International career
Ramesses was part of the USVI under-20 squad that competed at the 2018 CONCACAF U-20 Championship held in the United States. He scored against Suriname in a defeat in the teams' opening match.

Ramesses made his senior international debut on October 12, 2019, in a 2019–20 CONCACAF Nations League qualifying match against Barbados. On 19 November 2019 he scored his first senior goal for USVI against Saint Martin in the 2019–20 CONCACAF Nations League C.

International goals
Scores and results list USVI's goal tally first.

International career statistics

References

External links
Soccerway profile
National Football Teams profile
Kean Cougars profile

2000 births
Living people
United States Virgin Islands soccer players
United States Virgin Islands international soccer players
Association football forwards
People from West Windsor, New Jersey
Soccer players from New Jersey
Sportspeople from Mercer County, New Jersey
West Windsor-Plainsboro High School South alumni